Curriculum for Excellence is the national curriculum for Scottish schools for learners from the ages 3–18.

It was developed out of a 2002 consultation exercise – the 'National Debate on Education' – undertaken by the-then Scottish Executive on the state of school education. In response to the National Debate, Ministers established a Curriculum Review Group in November 2003 to identify the purposes of education for the 3-18 age range and to determine key principles to be applied in a redesign the curriculum. Its work resulted in the publication in November 2004 of the document A Curriculum for Excellence. This document identified four key purposes of education; those that enable young people to become, "successful learners, confident individuals, responsible citizens and effective contributors."

The Curriculum for Excellence was implemented in schools in 2010−11.
Its implementation is overseen by Education Scotland.

In Scotland, councils and schools both have some responsibility for what is taught in schools and they must also take national guidelines and advice into account.

A review was undertaken by the OECD, having been commissioned by the Scottish Government to look at the broad general education.

Qualifications
New qualifications were set out in 2014 by the Scottish Qualifications Authority to meet with the Curriculum for Excellence. The new qualifications are National 1, National 2, National 3, National 4, National 5, Higher and Advanced Higher which replaced the former Standard Grade. National 1–4 qualifications are internally assessed by teachers, whereas National 5, Higher and Advanced Higher qualifications are externally assessed by the Scottish Qualifications Authority.

Criticism

Before its introduction, many within the Scottish teaching profession, including the teachers' trade union The Educational Institute of Scotland (EIS) and its members, believed that the Curriculum for Excellence was too vague, in particular regarding its supposed 'outcomes and experiences'. There existed a fear that this imprecision would result in a lack of clarity in what was expected of teachers in the classroom and in the assessment of pupils' progress and attainment.

The original concerns led East Renfrewshire, one of the most educationally successful local authorities, to delay implementation of the secondary school phase of the new curriculum by one year. Some Scottish independent schools, including St Aloysius' College, in Glasgow, chose to do the same.

References

See also 

 Education in Scotland
 Education in the United Kingdom

Other UK curriculums 

 National Curriculum for England - England

 Northern Ireland Curriculum - Northern Ireland
 National Curriculum for Wales (2008 to 2026) - Wales (old)
 Curriculum for Wales (2022 to present) - Wales (new)

External links 
 Curriculum for Excellence on Scottish Government website
 BBC guide
 Bright Red Publishing Digital Zone

Curricula
Education in Scotland
2002 establishments in Scotland
2002 in education
Standards-based education
Critical pedagogy
Education reform